Trinity East, Newfoundland and Labrador is a designated place in the Canadian province of Newfoundland and Labrador. It is southwest of Catalina on the Bonavista Peninsula.

History 
The way office was established in 1879.

Geography 
Trinity East is in Newfoundland within Subdivision J of Division No. 7.

Demographics 

See also 
List of communities in Newfoundland and Labrador
List of designated places in Newfoundland and Labrador

References 

Designated places in Newfoundland and Labrador